In linguistics, the aspect of a verb is a grammatical category that defines the temporal flow (or lack thereof) in a given action, event, or state. As its name suggests, the habitual aspect (abbreviated ), not to be confused with iterative aspect or frequentative aspect, specifies an action as occurring habitually: the subject performs the action usually, ordinarily, or customarily. As such, the habitual aspect provides structural information on the nature of the subject referent, "John smokes" being interpretable as "John is a smoker", "Enjoh habitually gets up early in the morning" as "Enjoh is an early bird". The habitual aspect is a type of imperfective aspect, which does not depict an event as a single entity viewed only as a whole but instead specifies something about its internal temporal structure.

Östen Dahl found that the habitual past, the most common tense context for the habitual, occurred in only seven of 60 languages sampled, including English. Especially in Turkic languages such as Azerbaijani and Turkish, he found that the habitual can occur in combination with the predictive mood.

Hindustani 

Modern Hindustani (Hindi and Urdu) has a specific participle form to mark the habitual aspect. Habitual aspect in Hindi grammar is marked by the habitual participle. The habitual participle is constructed from the infinitive form of the verb by removing the infinitive marker -nā from the verb root and adding -tā. The participles agree with the gender and the number of the subject of the sentence which is marked by the vowel the participles end in. Periphrastic Hindustani verb forms consist of two elements. The first element is the aspect marker. The second element is the tense-mood marker.

There are four different copulas with which the habitual participle can be used: honā (to be, to happen), rêhnā (to stay, to remain), jānā (to go), and ānā (to come). These verbs, even when they are used as copula, themselves can be turned into aspectual participles and can be used with the default auxiliary verb honā (to be), hence forming sub-aspects that combine the nuance of two aspects. The auxiliary rêhnā (to stay) gives a nuance of continuity of the perfective state, jānā (to go) is used to construct the passive voice when used with the perfective participle, shows that the action is completed when it is used with intransitive verbs and shows continuity when it is used with habitual participle.

Hindustani has three grammatical aspectsː habitual, perfective and progressive. Conjugating the auxiliary verbs, which are above in the infinitive form, into their aspectual forms using the auxiliary honā (to be) gives subaspectual forms for the habitual aspect in their infintive formː

English

Standard English has two habitual aspectual forms in the past tense. One is illustrated by the sentence I used to go there frequently. The used to [infinitive] construction always refers to the habitual aspect when the infinitive is a non-stative verb; in contrast, when used to is used with a stative verb, the aspect can be interpreted as continuous (that is, it indicates an ongoing, unchanging state, as in I used to know that), although Bernard Comrie classifies this, too, as habitual. Used to can be used with or without an indicator of temporal location in the past (We used to do that, We used to do that in 1974); but the time indicator cannot be too specific; for example, *We used to do that at 3 pm yesterday is not grammatical.

The second way that habituality is expressed in the past is by using the auxiliary verb would, as in Last summer we would go there every day. This usage requires a lexical indication of when the action occurred; by itself the sentence We would go there does not express habituality, while We used to go there does even though it does not specify when. As with used to, would also has other uses in English that do not indicate habituality: in In January 1986 I knew I would graduate in four months, it indicates the future viewed from a past perspective; in I would go if I felt better, it indicates the conditional mood.

English can also indicate habituality in a time-unspecific way, referring generically to the past, present, and future, by using the auxiliary will as in He will make that mistake all the time, won't he?.  As with used to and would, the auxiliary will has other uses as well: as an indicator of future time (The sun will rise tomorrow at 6:14), and as a modal verb indicating volition (At this moment I will not tolerate dissent).

Habitual aspect is frequently expressed in unmarked form in English, as in I walked to work every day for ten years, I walk to work every day, and I will walk to work every day after I get well.

The habitual and progressive aspects can be combined in English, as in He used to be playing.. Every time I visit, he's always making something.

Present tense

African American Vernacular English and Caribbean English use an invariant be to mark habitual or extended actions in the present tense. Some Hiberno-English in Ireland uses the construction do be to mark the habitual present.

Romance languages
Romance languages like French, Spanish, Italian, and Portuguese do not have a grammatical form that is specific to the habitual aspect. In the past tense, they have a form called the imperfect, which combines the past tense with the imperfective aspect and indicates that a past ongoing process was habitual or continuous.

Cantonese
Cantonese, a Sinitic language, has a dedicated particle to express the habitual aspect, 開 hoi1, which follows the verb. This is unlike Mandarin and some other Sinitic languages, which have no grammatical indicators of the habitual aspect, but may express habituality via circumlocution.

References

Semantics
Grammatical aspects